Sophie Couture is a couture label founded by Gunel Babayeva, an Azerbaijani fashion designer. 

Sophie Couture is noted for their silhouettes, bridal gowns, and evening gowns.

History
Sophie Couture was founded in 2015 in Baku, Azerbaijan by Gunel Babayeva. Babayeva was educated at the Azerbaijan State Economic University. She named it after her first child, Sophia. 

In 2019, Sophie Couture took part in Arab Fashion Week.

In 2022, Sophie Couture participated in Cannes Film Festival.

Models
 Mickey Guyton
 Coco Jones
 Ani Lorak
 Hina Khan
 Holly Willoughby
 Zuri Hall
 Michelle Salas
 Regina Todorenko

References

Azerbaijani fashion
2015 establishments in Azerbaijan